Zeca may refer to:

 José Afonso (1929–1987), Portuguese folk and political musician also known mononymously as Zeca

 Zeca (footballer, born 1946), full name Jose Luiz Ferreira Rodrigues, Brazilian football manager known mononymously as Zeca
 Zeca (footballer, born 1975), full name José António Gonçalves da Silva, Portuguese footballer known mononymously as Zeca
 Zeca (footballer, born 1988), full name José Carlos Gonçalves Rodrigues, Portuguese-Greek footballer known mononymously as Zeca
 Zeca (footballer, born 1990), David da Silva Lima, Brazilian football left-back
 Zeca (footballer, born 1994), full name José Carlos Cracco Neto, Brazilian footballer known mononymously as Zeca
 Zeca (footballer, born 1997), full name José Joaquim de Carvalho, Brazilian footballer known mononymously as Zeca
 Zeca Amaral (born 1967), Angolan football manager
 Zeca Baleiro (born 1966), Brazilian pop musician
 Zeca Marques (born 1961), Portuguese South African footballer
 Zeca Pagodinho (born 1959), Brazilian singer/songwriter
 Zeča, an island in Croatia